Sidcot School is a British co-educational private school for boarding and day pupils, associated with the Religious Society of Friends. It is one of seven Quaker schools in England. The school is based in the Mendip Hills near the village of Winscombe, Somerset and caters for children between the ages of 3 and 18. Children aged from 3 to 11 are educated in Sidcot Junior School, which is located on its own site adjacent to the main campus. About 130 of the school's 525 pupils (2010) are in this junior school.

In the senior school, nearly half of the 395 pupils are boarders. Over 29 different countries are represented making up 25% of the school. Boarders board in the grounds in one of the 6 boarding houses. The girls' houses are Newcombe, School House Girls and Meadowside, and the boys' are School House Boys and Wing House.

Although a Quaker School, pupils come from a variety of different faiths and cultures.  All pupils are expected to join in with a short Meeting for Worship every Friday morning instead of assembly.

Prior to September 2013, Sidcot school operated a 3 house system named after explorers: Nansen, Shackleton and Rhodes. A new House system was introduced at the beginning of the 2013 Autumn term.  There are four houses in the revised house system named after the cardinal points of the compass: North, East, South and West, each house has a colour: Blue, Yellow, Green and Red respectively. The houses are mainly used for sports days and house matches of sport.  One of the principal aims behind the new system is to allow greater interaction between students in the Senior and Junior Schools.  The introduction of House Assemblies at points in the term facilitates students to work together within their Houses. All staff are aligned to a House and given the opportunity to participate in its life as well as support House events.

In addition to its sports centre that houses a 25m pool and equestrian facilities, Sidcot has built a new creative arts block, with extensive drama, art and music facilities, which opened in June 2009.  It is open to the public for exhibitions, courses and workshops.

Many past pupils and teachers are members of the Sidcotians (Alumni Network).

History
The first Quaker school was established at Winscombe in 1699 to teach boys of Quaker families. The current school reopened in 1808 and welcomed girls, making Sidcot one of the oldest co-educational boarding schools in the UK - although it was not until the late 19th century that they were all taught together for the first time.

Uniform
The school uniform is predominantly navy blue. All pupils must wear a blue and white striped shirt and blazer (both of which sport the school's logo of a ship) until 6.30 pm from Monday to Friday. Boys must wear ties, and after the recent bi-centenary celebrations boys have two tie options. Sixth form must wear 'smart-casual' clothing and on Monday 'interview smart' suits.

School logo
The school logo has recently been changed. The ship, because of its historical significance as the logo for many years has been retained, but is now shown forging through the waves. The current colour palette has been built on the school's traditional blue.

Notable former pupils

Notable Sidcot Old Scholars include:

Charlie Albone an English/Australian tv presenter
Tim Bevan, film producer
Percy Bigland, portrait painter
Mary Brazier, neuroscientist
Nick Broomfield, documentary film maker
Edward Theodore Compton, landscape painter
Robin Cowling, English rugby union player
Aldo van Eyck, Dutch Modernist architect and city planner (1932–1935)
Mary Fulbrook, academic and historian
Charles Gilpin, MP
Charles Handley-Read, architectural historian
Douglas Macmillan, British civil servant, and founder of the Macmillan Cancer Support charity.
George Newman, first Chief Medical Officer
Stephen Peet, documentary film maker
Brian Priestman, conductor
Robert Millner Shackleton FRS, Professor of Geology
Mary Tregear, art historian
Anthony Waller, film director (Mute Witness, An American Werewolf in Paris)
Zoë Wanamaker, American-born English actress
Deborah Warner, stage and film director
Anthony Brian Watts FRS, Professor of Marine Geology and Geophysics
Vincent Watts, Vice-Chancellor of the University of East Anglia (1997–2002)
Justin Webb, journalist and presenter, BBC Radio 4's Today programme.

Further reading
 Blaschko, M.D. Sidcot School: register of old scholars, 1808–1958, 1958; supplements 1958-1963, 1963–1968, 1968–1973, 1973–1978, 1978-1983.
 Greenfield, C. The white-robed queen: a view of the school at Sidcot since 1699. (Pub. 1994).
 Hall, K. & Hall, C.  Sidcot School : register of old scholars, 1808-1998. (Pub. 2001).
 Hutchinson, G.W. Bevan and Mabel Lean of Sidcot: a record of life and progress at Sidcot School, 1902-1930. (Pub. 1981).
 Knight, F.A. A history of Sidcot School, 1808-1908''. (Pub. 1908).<ref>Knight, F.A. A history of Sidcot School, 1808-1908 is available online]</ref>
 Newman, W.E. Sidcot School register, 1808-1912. (Pub. 1919).
 Roberts, E. A Sidcot pageant. (Pub. 1935).
 OSA Annual reports. (Pub. 1878).
 Gladwin, Christine Island in the Hills — Reminiscences of Sidcot School 1900-1930. (Pub. 1998).
 Gladwin, Christine By Green's Three Acres — Sidcot School 1699-1729. (Pub. 1999).
 Gladwin, Christine Reflections of an Island — Reminiscences of Sidcot School 1930-1958. 
 Gladwin, Christine The Quaker Meeting House Sidcot (Winscombe and Sandford MilleNnium). (Pub 2001) .
 The Island'' [school magazine

See also
 List of Friends Schools

References

External links
 Sidcot
 
 Sidcotians

Private schools in North Somerset
Quaker schools in England
Co-educational boarding schools
Boarding schools in Somerset
International Baccalaureate schools in England